The France national Baseball5 team represents France in international Baseball5 competitions. They are the current European champions.

History
France participated in the first Baseball5 European Championship played in Vilnius and won, earning one of the two European spots for the 2022 Baseball5 World Cup in Mexico City.

At the 2022 Baseball5 World Cup, France finished 9th with a 3–5 record.

Current roster

Staff

Tournament record

Baseball5 World Cup

Baseball5 European Championship

References

National baseball5 teams
Baseball5